Eric "Rick" Froberg (born January 1968, also known by the pseudonyms Rick Fork and Rick Farr) is an American musician and visual artist. He was born in Los Angeles, lived in Encinitas, California, and currently resides in Brooklyn. In his musical career he has been the singer and guitarist for the San Diego-area bands Pitchfork, Drive Like Jehu, and Hot Snakes, performing alongside fellow San Diego musician John Reis. Froberg has also played with the Last of the Juanitas, Thingy and Obits.

In his career as a visual artist and illustrator he has created album art, promotional artwork, and merchandise designs for all of his bands as well as for Rocket from the Crypt and Reis' Swami Records label.

Discography

References

External links 

 

1968 births
Living people
Musicians from Los Angeles
American punk rock musicians
American punk rock singers
Drive Like Jehu members
American illustrators
Artists from Los Angeles
Hot Snakes members